Code Breakers is a 2005 American sports drama television film directed by Rod Holcomb and written by G. Ross Parker, based on the 2000 non-fiction book A Return to Glory by Bill McWilliams. The film chronicles the real-life 1951 cheating scandal at the United States Military Academy, and the impact on its football team. It stars Zachery Ty Bryan, Jeff Roop, Jake Busey, Corey Sevier, Theo Rossi, Robin Dunne, Adam Grimes, Jude Ciccolella, Dan Petronijevic, Richard Zeppieri, and Scott Glenn as Coach Earl "Red" Blaik.

The film aired on ESPN on December 10, 2005.

Synopsis
The film chronicles the 1951 cheating scandal at West Point and its impact on Army's football team, which was forced to dismiss virtually its entire squad. The film begins going into the 1950 Army–Navy Game, the Cadets football team was heavily favored, yet went on to lose to a weak Midshipmen squad, 14–2. The Academy and football team were then thrown into a scandal when 90 cadets, including 37 lettering football players, resigned in a cheating scandal which broke the Academy's Honor Code. The film follows Brian Nolan, a cadet who is led to a ring of cheaters when he is need of academic help to pass. A serious piece of the film involves the relationship of Coach Blaik and his son Bob, one of the cadets responsible for cheating.

Cast

Production
Filming took place in Toronto. A principal shooting location was Victoria College. Cinematographer Thomas Del Ruth used the 1950 film The West Point Story, directed by his father Roy Del Ruth, as a template in recreating West Point in the 1950s.

Release
The film aired on December 10, 2005 at 9 pm ET on ESPN and ESPN HD.

References

External links
 

2005 films
2005 drama films
2000s English-language films
2000s sports drama films
American drama television films
American films based on actual events
American football films
American sports drama films
Army Black Knights football
Cultural depictions of players of American football
Drama films based on actual events
ESPN Films films
Films about academic scandals
Films based on non-fiction books
Films directed by Rod Holcomb
Films scored by Anthony Marinelli
Films set in 1950
Films set in 1951
Films set in the United States Military Academy
Films shot in Toronto
Sports films based on actual events
Sports television films
Television films based on actual events
Television films based on books
2000s American films